Dayman Ma`ak (Always With You) is a 1954 Egyptian musical comedy romance film directed and co-written by Henry Barakat and starring Mohamed Fawzi, Salah Nazmi, Faten Hamama, and Abdel Waress Assar.

Plot 
Tefeeda is a girl who leaves her brother-in-law, who was forcing her to steal. She hides with a friend who lives with three young men, and one of them, starts flirting with her, but she resists him. She marries her friend after the man tries to separate them several times. The story climaxes with a mysterious murder investigation.

Cast
 Faten Hamama as Tefeeda
 Mohamed Fawzi as Hamada
 Abdel Waress Assar
 Salah Nazmi

References

External links

1954 films
1950s Arabic-language films
Egyptian black-and-white films
1954 romantic comedy films
1954 musical comedy films
Egyptian romantic musical films
1950s romantic musical films
Egyptian romantic comedy films